Aha Khani (also Romanized as Āhā Khānī; also known as Āhūgānī (Persian: اهوگاني), ‘Alīkhānī, and ‘Alī Khānī) is a village in Karian Rural District, in the Central District of Minab County, Hormozgan Province, Iran. At the 2006 census, its population was 255, in 50 families.

References 

Populated places in Minab County